Thomas Franck (born 24 February 1971) is a German former professional footballer who played as a midfielder.

Football career 
Franck was born in Heppenheim. He made his professional debuts with SV Waldhof Mannheim on 12 May 1989 at the age of 18, playing 12 minutes in a 3–4 home loss against VfB Stuttgart, with the club then in the Bundesliga (it would be his only appearance of the season, and he played in 18 matches more the following campaign, which ended in relegation).

In the 1990 summer, he moved to Borussia Dortmund, helping to the club's domestic consolidation in his first seasons, and also contributing with five matches in its 1992–93 UEFA Cup runner-up run, scoring in a 7–2 home drubbing of Floriana FC in the first round. He was, however, only a fringe player when the team won back-to-back national championships (only 20 matches combined), leaving the club in June 1996.

Franck subsequently signed for 1. FC Kaiserslautern, winning consecutive league titles, one in each of the two major levels. In the 1997–98 topflight campaign, however, he appeared in no matches, due to injuries. In the following years, he appeared with three teams in different divisions – including former side Waldhof – with no impact whatsoever (he was also sidelined for the entirety of 1998–99), finally retiring from football at the age of 33.

Honours 
Borussia Dortmund
 Bundesliga: 1994–95, 1995–96
 UEFA Cup: runner-up 1992–93

1. FC Kaiserslautern
 Bundesliga: 1997–98
 2. Bundesliga: 1996–97

References

External links 
 
 

1971 births
Living people
People from Bergstraße (district)
Sportspeople from Darmstadt (region)
German footballers
Germany under-21 international footballers
Association football midfielders
Bundesliga players
2. Bundesliga players
SV Waldhof Mannheim players
Borussia Dortmund players
1. FC Kaiserslautern players
SV Darmstadt 98 players
Footballers from Hesse
West German footballers